Live in Vienna may refer to:

Live in Vienna (Böhse Onkelz album)
Live in Vienna (Cluster album)
Live in Vienna (Cecil Taylor album)
Live in Vienna (King Crimson album)